Johan Brunström and Andreas Siljeström were the defending champions but lost in the quarterfinals to Marin and Tomislav Draganja.

Marco Cecchinato and Matteo Donati won the title after defeating Draganja and Draganja 6–3, 6–4 in the final.

Seeds

Draw

References
 Main Draw

Open Citta Della Disfida - Doubles
2017 Doubles